Xanthonychidae is a family of air-breathing land snails, terrestrial pulmonate gastropod mollusks in the superfamily Helicoidea. 

This family is within the superorder Eupulmonata (according to the taxonomy of the Gastropoda by Bouchet & Rocroi, 2005).

2017 taxonomy 
The family Xanthonychidae consists of the following subfamilies:
 Echinichinae F.G. Thompson & Naranjo-García, 2012
 Epiphragmophorinae Hoffmann, 1928
 Helminthoglyptinae Pilsbry, 1939
 Humboldtianinae Pilsbry, 1939
 Lysinoinae Hoffmann, 1928
 tribe Lysinoini Hoffmann, 1928
 tribe Leptariontini H. Nordsieck, 1987 - synonym: Tryonigentinae Schileyko, 1991
 tribe Metostracini H. Nordsieck, 1987
 Metostracinae H. Nordsieck, 1987: synonym of Metostracini H. Nordsieck, 1987 (original rank)
 Monadeniinae H. Nordsieck, 1987
 Xanthonychinae Strebel & Pfeffer, 1879

Trichodiscininae H. Nordsieck, 1987: belongs to the family Trichodiscinidae H. Nordsieck, 1987

Lysinoidae may be treated as a separate family with subfamilies Leptariontinae, Lysinoinae and Metostracinae.

Genera 

Genera in the family Xanthonychidae include:
Subfamily Echinichinae F.G. Thompson & Naranjo-García, 2012
 Echinix F.G. Thompson & Naranjo-García, 2012

 Subfamily Epiphragmophorinae Hoffmann, 1928
 Angrandiella Ancey, 1886
 Dinotropis Pilsbry & Cockerell, 1937
 Doeringina Ihering, 1929
 Epiphragmophora Doering, 1875
 Karlschmidtia F. Haas, 1955
 Minaselates Cuezzo & Pena, 2017
 Pilsbrya Ancey, 1887

 subfamily Helminthoglyptinae Pilsbry, 1939

 Subfamily Humboldtianinae Pilsbry, 1939
 Tribe Bunnyini H. Nordsieck, 1987
 Bunnya H. B. Baker, 1942
 Tribe Humboldtianini Pilsbry, 1939
 Humboldtiana Ihering, 1892

 Subfamily Lysinoinae Hoffmann, 1928
 Tribe Leptariontini H. Nordsieck, 1987
 Leptarionta Crosse & P. Fischer, 1872 
 Semiconchula Naranjo-Garcia & Polaco, 2000
 Tryonigens Pilsbry, 1927
 Tribe Lysinoini Hoffmann, 1928
 Lysinoe H. Adams & A. Adams, 1855
 Tribe Metostracini H. Nordsieck, 1987
 Cryptostrakon W.G. Binney, 1879  
 Metostracon Pilsbry, 1900

 Subfamily Monadeniinae H. Nordsieck, 1987
 Monadenia Pilsbry, 1895

 Subfamily Xanthonychinae Strebel & Pfeffer, 1879
  Xanthonyx Crosse & P. Fischer, 1867 - the type genus of the family Xanthonychidae

References

 Bank, R. A. (2017). Classification of the Recent terrestrial Gastropoda of the World. Last update: July 16th, 2017

External links